The Glen Innes Correctional Centre, an Australian minimum security prison for males, is located  on the Gwydir Highway, near Glen Innes, New South Wales.  The centre is operated by Corrective Services NSW an agency of the Department of Attorney General and Justice of the Government of New South Wales. The centre detains sentenced felons under New South Wales and/or Commonwealth legislation and is a pre-release centre to prepare inmates for release to the community.

History
Established as the Mount Mitchell Afforestation Camp on 15 August 1928, the facility has also been known as Glen Innes Afforestation camp, and now the Glen Innes Correctional Centre. Between 1928 and 1950 the site was used only for trustworthy, honest prisoners. In 1966 the site was expanded with an additional 35 huts added to the facility. By the mid-1970s, the site accommodated 95 prisoners.

Notable prisoners

 Danny WicksAustralian professional rugby league  footballer who served an eighteen-month prison sentence for trafficking drugs.

See also

Punishment in Australia

References

External links
Glen Innes Correctional Centre website

Prisons in New South Wales
1928 establishments in Australia
Glen Innes, New South Wales